Istobnoye is a rural locality (a selo) and the administrative center of Istobnyanskaya Territorial Administration, Gubkinsky District, Belgorod Oblast, Russia. The population was 1,515 as of 2010. There are 17 streets.

Geography 
Istobnoye is located 34 km southwest of Gubkin (the district's administrative centre) by road. Bogomolye is the nearest rural locality.

References 

Rural localities in Gubkinsky District